Komaritsa is a rural locality (a village) in Pogorelovskoye Rural Settlement, Totemsky  District, Vologda Oblast, Russia. The population was 10 as of 2002.

Geography 
Komaritsa is located 59 km southwest of Totma (the district's administrative centre) by road. Toporikha is the nearest rural locality.

References 

Rural localities in Tarnogsky District